Dewitt Owens (September 25, 1900 – May 2, 1983) was an American Negro league shortstop between 1926 and 1930.

A native of Austin, Texas, Owens attended Samuel Huston College. He made his Negro leagues debut in 1926 with the Cleveland Elites. He went on to play for the Birmingham Black Barons the following two seasons, then spent a year with the Memphis Red Sox before finishing his career back in Birmingham in 1930. Owens died in Austin in 1983 at age 82.

References

External links
 and Seamheads

1900 births
1983 deaths
Birmingham Black Barons players
Cleveland Elites players
Memphis Red Sox players
20th-century African-American sportspeople
Baseball infielders